This article lists the confirmed squads for the 2020 Thomas & Uber Cup. The rankings used to decide the order of play are based on the BWF World Ranking per 21 September 2021. The age listed for each player is on 9 October 2021, the first day of the tournament.

Thomas Cup

Group A

Indonesia

Chinese Taipei

Algeria

Thailand

Group B

Denmark

South Korea

France

Germany

Group C

China

India

Netherlands

Tahiti

Group D

Japan

Malaysia

Canada

Uber Cup

Group A

Japan

Indonesia

Germany

France

Group B

Thailand

India

Spain

Scotland

Group C

South Korea

Chinese Taipei

Tahiti

Egypt

Group D

China

Denmark

Malaysia

Canada

References

External Links
Tournament Link
Official Website – 2020 Thomas & Uber Cup

 
Badminton-related lists